Tourist in My Own Backyard is the second solo album from English folk singer-songwriter Dan Clews. It was released on 28 April 2014.

Music videos
Three music videos were commissioned for Tourist in My Own Backyard: "Take One Away", "That's Enough for Me", and the lead single, "Edge of the World".

The video for "Take One Away" was directed by Zac Moss. Clews would later compose and perform the soundtrack to Exile, a short 2013 horror film directed by Moss. The soundtrack, inspired by the work of drone metal bands such as Earth and Sunn O))), would be a departure from Clews's singer-songwriter background.

Track listing

Two tracks are re-recordings of songs from Dan Clews and the Stars Above's LP, The Good Mile (2005): "Bring You Round" (previously recorded as "We'll Bring You Round") and "Pixie Poem".

References

2014 albums